Eddie Ray Fisher (born December 17, 1973) is an American musician and songwriter. He is the drummer for American pop rock band OneRepublic. Eddie grew up in Mission Viejo, California and currently resides in Denver, Colorado, where OneRepublic is based. Fisher joined OneRepublic in 2005, and has been the band's drummer ever since.

Personal life
Fisher became interested in drumming when he was in seventh grade after he saw a U2 concert in the Tempe Stadium, Arizona.
Eddie has been married to Rhiannon Adler since 2017.

OneRepublic
He joined the band in 2006 after playing with the band's former bassist. Fisher has also been credited for writing songs such as: Say (All I Need), Stop & Stare, "Someone to Save You", "Won't Stop" and "All Fall Down" off OneRepublic's debut album Dreaming Out Loud. He also contributed to writing the song "Good Life" from the band's second album, Waking Up. He did not write any songs on their third album, Native. He also helped co-write the song “Colors” on the international deluxe edition of their 2016 album, Oh My My (album).

Outside of OneRepublic
Fisher is known to have drummed on numerous tracks for the band The Violet Burning. He is credited for drumming on tracks such as "Save You" and "If I Can't Have You" (Kelly Clarkson). He also drummed on the track "Please Don't Stop The Rain" (James Morrison). He also writes songs for other artists.

References

1973 births
Living people
Musicians from Hillsboro, Oregon
People from Mission Viejo, California
Musicians from California
OneRepublic members
20th-century American drummers
American male drummers
21st-century American drummers
OneRepublic